Azumah Nelson (born 19 July 1958, affectionately known as the Professor) is a Ghanaian former professional boxer who competed from 1979 to 2008. He was a two-weight world champion, having held the WBC featherweight title from 1984 to 1987 and the WBC super-featherweight title twice between 1988 and 1997. He also challenged once for the unified WBC and IBF lightweight titles in 1990. At regional level he held the ABU, and Commonwealth featherweight titles between 1980 and 1982. Widely considered one of the greatest African boxers of all time, he is currently ranked as the 31st greatest pound for pound boxer of all time by BoxRec.

Amateur career 
Nelson competed at the 1978 All-Africa Games and 1978 Commonwealth Games, winning gold medals in featherweight at both events. He was awarded Amateur Boxer of the year by the Sports Writers Association of Ghana (SWAG) that same year.

Professional career 
Despite all his early achievements and being undefeated in 13 fights, Nelson was virtually unknown outside Ghana. Because of this, he was a decisive underdog when, on short notice, he challenged WBC featherweight champion Salvador Sánchez on 21 July 1982 at the Madison Square Garden in New York. Nelson lost the fight by fifteenth-round knockout.

Featherweight champion 
Nelson won all four of his fights in 1983, and he began 1984 by beating Hector Cortez by decision on 9 March in Las Vegas. Then, on 8 December of that year, he became boxing royalty by knocking out Wilfredo Gómez in round 11 to win the WBC featherweight championship. Behind on the three judges' scorecards, Nelson rallied in that last round to become champion in Puerto Rico.

Super-featherweight 
Nelson began 1988 by defeating Mario Martinez by a split decision over 12 rounds in Los Angeles to win the vacant WBC super featherweight title. Nelson was dropped in the 10th round of their encounter and the decision was not well received.

On 1 December 1995, defeated world champion Gabriel Ruelas in the fifth round to claim the title.

His first defense took place almost a year later, when he and Leija had their third bout. Nelson retained the title with a six-round knockout. As had become his common practice, that was the only time Nelson fought in 1996.

In 1997, Nelson lost the Lineal & WBC titles to Genaro Hernandez when beaten on points in twelve rounds.

Legacy
The Azumah Nelson Sports Complex at Kaneshie in Accra was named after him.

Biography 
In 2014 the biography of Azumah Nelson was published. Written by Ashley Morrison it was titled "The Professor - The Life Story of Azumah Nelson" was published by Strategic Book Publishing.

Personal life
Nelson has 6 children; David Nelson Dorinda Nelson, Doris Nelson Dylis Nelson, Dalvin Nelson Deloris Nelson, the son, Dalvin Azumah Nelson Junior, whom Nelson is training as a boxer. His mother was known as Madam Comfort Atwei Quarcoo and his sisters are Beatrice Abiana, Theresa Louisa, Lakia Felecia and Oboshie Susana. 
Currently married to Priscilla Boakye Nelson.

In July 2018, Azumah organized a fight night to celebrate his 60th birthday at the Bukom Boxing Arena. This event brought together fighters from highly rated gyms in the country to fight contenders in their divisions. Some dignitaries including Nii Lante Vanderpuiye and Nii Amarkai Amarteifio who are two former sports ministers, Ian Walker the British High Commissioner to Ghana and Peter Zwennes the president of the Ghana Boxing Authority, graced the occasion. In all there were five bouts, three of which were won by knockout.

Professional boxing record

See also
List of featherweight boxing champions
List of super featherweight boxing champions
List of WBA world champions
List of WBC world champions

References

External links
 
Azumah Nelson - CBZ Profile

|- 

|- 

|-

|-

1958 births
Boxers at the 1978 Commonwealth Games
Featherweight boxers
Super-featherweight boxers
Lightweight boxers
Living people
International Boxing Hall of Fame inductees
World boxing champions
World Boxing Council champions
African Boxing Union champions
Commonwealth Games gold medallists for Ghana
Boxers from Accra
Ga-Adangbe people
Ghanaian male boxers
Commonwealth Games medallists in boxing
African Games gold medalists for Ghana
African Games medalists in boxing
Competitors at the 1978 All-Africa Games
African Games medalists
Medallists at the 1978 Commonwealth Games